Guzara (Gozareh) District is situated in the center of Herat Province, Afghanistan, 10 km south of Herat. It borders Injil District to the north, Pashtun Zarghun District to the east, Adraskan District to the south and Zinda Jan District to the west. The district center Guzara (Gozareh) is on the main road Herat-Kandahar.

References

External links

Districts of Herat Province